Abu Yahya Abu Bakr ash-Shahid or Abu Bakr was a grandson of the Caliph Abu Ishaq Ibrahim I, he ruled Tunisia for just 17 days in 1309.

Life 
The Caliph Abu Asida Muhammad II died in 1309, and, in accordance with the agreement signed by him with his nephew Abu-l-Baqa Khalid An-Nasr, he was to be proclaimed a caliph. The sheikhs of Almohad sheikhs of Tunis however elevated Abu Bakr to the throne. After 17 days he was deposed and executed by Abu-l-Baqa, who arrived with an army from Bejaia. He was thereafter known as "Ash-Shahid" ("the martyr").

References 

1309 deaths
14th-century Hafsid caliphs